Grit (going back to Old English grytt or grytta or gryttes) is an almost extinct word for bran, chaff, or mill-dust.  It is also used for oats that have been husked but not ground, or that have been only coarsely ground—coarse oatmeal. 

The word continues to exist in modern dishes like grits, an American corn (maize)-based food common in the Southern United States, consisting of coarsely ground corn; and the German red grits, Rote Grütze, a traditional pudding made of summer berries and starch and sugar. Grit here was the cheap supplier of starch.  Gruels of grit, oatmeal grit preferably, were standard European nutrition of the lower classes in the Middle Ages and Early Modern Period.

See also

 List of porridges

References

External links
 OED on word usage, restricted access

Cereals
Porridges